Erik Thomas Cole (born November 6, 1978) is an American former professional ice hockey left winger. Originally drafted by the Hurricanes in the 1998 NHL Entry Draft, Cole played 15 seasons in the NHL for the Carolina Hurricanes, Edmonton Oilers, Montreal Canadiens, Dallas Stars and Detroit Red Wings.

Playing career

Amateur
Early in his career, Cole played high school ice hockey for the Oswego Buccaneers in his hometown of Oswego, New York. The Des Moines Buccaneers of the United States Hockey League (USHL) drafted him after a family friend based in Des Moines, Mark Pierce, had several scouts take a look. He played 48 games for the Buccaneers during the 1996-7 USHL season, scoring 30 goals and 34 assists for 64 points.

Cole then attended Clarkson University in Potsdam, New York, where he played college hockey for the Golden Knights ice hockey team in the NCAA's ECAC conference. At the end of his first season, the Carolina Hurricanes selected him 71st overall in the third round of the 1998 NHL Entry Draft. Cole would play two more collegiate seasons with the Golden Knights, departing in 2000.

Professional
In the 2001–02 season, his rookie year, Cole scored six goals during the 2002 Stanley Cup playoffs. Additionally, he was one-third of the "BBC Line," which also featured Bates Battaglia and Rod Brind'Amour, during the Hurricanes' Stanley Cup run in 2002.

On December 19, 2005, Cole was chosen to represent Team USA ice hockey for the 2006 Winter Olympics in Turin. He was named alongside fellow Clarkson University alumnus Craig Conroy, then of the Calgary Flames. He also represented Team USA the next year at the 2007 IIHF World Championship in Moscow.

On March 4, 2006, Cole suffered a fractured vertebra in his neck after getting hit by Pittsburgh Penguins defenseman Brooks Orpik. The injury kept him out of the lineup until Game 6 of the 2006 Stanley Cup Finals, where the Hurricanes won the Stanley Cup in Game 7 over the Edmonton Oilers. On November 12, 2007, Cole went head-first into Florida Panthers goaltender Tomáš Vokoun; he was face down on the ice for over five minutes and was escorted off the ice via stretcher. It was a neck injury but not serious, and he traveled with the team to Tampa Bay.

Cole was the first player in the NHL to ever be awarded two penalty shots in the same game. On July 1, 2008, Cole was acquired by the Edmonton Oilers in exchange for Joni Pitkänen. On January 14, 2009, Cole, as a member of the Oilers, recorded his fifth NHL hat-trick against the Washington Capitals on goaltender José Théodore. Cole set an unofficial NHL record in the Fastest Skater event by skating around the entire ice at Rexall Place with a time of 13.117 seconds.

On March 4, 2009, Cole was traded back to Carolina in exchange for Patrick O'Sullivan and a second-round draft pick; O'Sullivan was traded to Carolina for Justin Williams and second-round pick earlier that day. On July 1, 2009, the Hurricanes signed Cole to a two-year, $5.8 million contract, which paid $2.8 million in 2009–10 and $3 million in 2010–11). On December 5, 2009, Cole scored his sixth career hat-trick against the Vancouver Canucks in Raleigh. The second goal went off the skate of former Clarkson University teammate, and then-Canuck, Willie Mitchell. Cole scored the third goal on an empty-net after goaltender Andrew Raycroft was pulled in favor for an extra attacker in the last minute of play.

On July 1, 2011, Cole signed a four-year, $18 million contract as a free agent with the Montreal Canadiens. Cole wore jersey number 72 for the Canadiens. During his first season with the Canadiens in 2011–12, Cole set career highs with 35 goals and 61 points. On March 23, 2012, Cole scored a natural hat-trick just 5:41 into a game against the Ottawa Senators, setting a Canadiens record for the quickest hat-trick from the start of a game.

On February 26, 2013, during the lockout-shortened 2012–13 season, after a slow start offensively, Cole was traded to the Dallas Stars in exchange for Michael Ryder and a third-round draft pick in 2013. In 28 games with Dallas, Cole would record six goals and one assist as the Stars would miss the 2013 playoffs.

On March 1, 2015, the Stars traded Cole to the Detroit Red Wings in exchange for Mattias Bäckman, Mattias Janmark-Nylén and a second-round draft pick in 2015. On April 8, it was announced that Cole would miss the remainder of the season with a spinal contusion he suffered on March 24 in a game against the Arizona Coyotes.

On September 20, 2017, Cole signed a one-day contract with the Carolina Hurricanes and subsequently announced his retirement from the NHL

Career statistics

Regular season and playoffs

International

Awards and honors

References

External links

Erik Cole's U.S. Olympic Team bio

1978 births
American men's ice hockey left wingers
Carolina Hurricanes draft picks
Carolina Hurricanes players
Cincinnati Cyclones (IHL) players
Clarkson Golden Knights men's ice hockey players
Dallas Stars players
Des Moines Buccaneers players
Detroit Red Wings players
Edmonton Oilers players
Eisbären Berlin players
Ice hockey players from New York (state)
Ice hockey players at the 2006 Winter Olympics
Living people
Montreal Canadiens players
Olympic ice hockey players of the United States
People from Oswego, New York
Stanley Cup champions
AHCA Division I men's ice hockey All-Americans